A kavass or cavass is an Ottoman Turkish term for an armed guard fulfilling various roles, often in the service of local notables and European foreigners of high status or means.

Etymology
The Turkish word is derived from the Arabic , 'archer',  meaning 'bow'.

Kavass is often spelled in English as kawas or kawass, especially in geographical contexts where Arabic exerts an influence on the author.

Role of the kavass and use of the term
The kavass was mainly known as a type of 19th-century Ottoman guard and escort, serving local and foreign dignitaries such as ambassadors and consuls. In the Holy Land (Ottoman Palestine) for instance, the right to employ kawasses was a prerogative of the Christian patriarchs and was only extended to the chief rabbi of the Palestinian Jews in 1842, along with his recognition as the official representative of the community (see millet system). This was quite significant, as a kawass was entitled to strike a misbehaving citizen even if he was a Muslim.

Kavasses preserved public order at the important worship spots of the Holy Land, which was part of the Ottoman Empire from 1516 until 1918, such as the churches of the Holy Sepulchre in Jerusalem and the of the Nativity in Bethlehem. They still are employed there, but with a primarily ceremonial role, as law enforcement is provided by the normal state authorities.

The 1911 entry in the Encyclopædia Britannica defines the kavass as "an armed police-officer; also for a courier such as it is usual to engage when travelling in Turkey." At the time, "Turkey" would still usually mean the entire declining Ottoman Empire.

More generally, in the words of the famous Nazi-time spy 'Cicero', by his real name Elyesa Bazna (1904–1970), "in Turkey anyone who serves a foreigner is known as a kavass, a term used especially for servants at foreign embassies."

Notes

References

Turkish words and phrases
Law enforcement in Turkey